The following is a list of Registered Historic Places in Midland County, Michigan.



|}

See also
 List of Michigan State Historic Sites in Midland County
 List of National Historic Landmarks in Michigan
 National Register of Historic Places listings in Michigan
 Listings in neighboring counties: Bay, Clare, Gratiot, Isabella, Saginaw

References

External links

Midland County
Midland County, Michigan
Buildings and structures in Midland County, Michigan